Requiem for the Indifferent is the fifth studio album by Dutch symphonic metal band Epica. It was released on 9 March 2012. The album was the first to feature solos by keyboardist Coen Janssen, which very rarely occur on the band's other releases, and was the final album to feature original member Yves Huts on bass guitar.

Background

Title
According to Mark Jansen, "This title refers to the end of an era. Mankind can no longer stick their head in the sand for the things that are happening around us. We are facing many challenges. There is an enormous tension between different religions and cultures, wars, natural disasters and a huge financial crisis, which is getting out of control. More than ever we will need each other to overcome these problems. As we are all connected; the universe, earth, nature, animals and human beings, this period in time will be the prelude to the end for those who still don't want to, or simply won't see it. A Requiem for the Indifferent but also a possibility for a new beginning with great new chances!"

Reception

General response to Requiem for the Indifferent was positive. AllMusic stated that the album "is a typically elaborate and ambitious affair, incorporating copious amounts of choral work and classical arrangements into the band's neatly established blend of goth, progressive, power, and symphonic metal." Natalie Zed of About.com staff considers Requiem for the Indifferent "a transitional album for the band", which tries to expand their musical range experimenting with "weird" riffing and new combination of vocals, while "losing none of the richness that has gained them fans."

Track listings

Personnel
Credits for Requiem for the Indifferent adapted from liner notes.

Epica
Simone Simons – lead vocals
Mark Jansen – rhythm guitar, unclean vocals
Isaac Delahaye – lead guitar
Yves Huts – bass
Coen Janssen – synthesizers, piano
Ariën van Weesenbeek – drums, grunts

Additional personnel
Amanda Somerville – backing vocals, vocal arrangements, lyrics editing, choir vocals

Epica Choir
Christoph Drescher, Laura Macrì, Linda Janssen, Previn Moore, Tanja Eisl

Production
Sascha Paeth – engineering, editing, mixing, vocal arrangements
Simon Oberender – Gregorian voice on "Internal Warfare", engineering, editing, mastering
Yves Huts – engineering
Olaf Reitmeier – engineering, editing, vocal lines production
Mark Jansen – orchestral arrangements
Coen Janssen – orchestral & choir arrangements
Isaac Delahaye – orchestral arrangements
Miro – engineering, orchestral arrangements
Gjalt Lucassen – Latin translation
Jaap Toorenaar – Latin translation

Editions
There was an error with all physical copies of the album's first edition, in which track 13, "Serenade of Self-Destruction", is an instrumental version without Simons and Jansen's vocal tracks. As compensation, Nuclear Blast Records decided to make the track (with the vocals) available as a free download. The glitch was corrected in the digipak versions. This instrumental version has a small part of vocals from Simone Simons at the very beginning, which makes it different from the total instrumental song released separately, on which you only hear the piano at the beginning.

To date there are nine different editions of the album:

The standard edition features the 13 tracks above.
The CD + shirt edition contains the standard edition of the album, along with a T-shirt in the size of choice.
The digipak edition contains the standard album and the bonus track "Nostalgia".
The 2-LP white vinyl edition is limited to 150 copies and contains an A2-sized poster.
The 2-LP black vinyl edition, which contains an A2-sized poster.
The mailorder edition, limited to 500 copies, contains a wooden box, which includes the limited digipak, an exclusive instrumental CD as bonus, artwork postcards and a certificate.
The American edition features the 13 tracks above and the bonus track "Twin Flames" (soundtrack version).
The 2-LP clear vinyl edition, which contains an A2-sized poster.
The 2-LP instrumental black vinyl edition, which contains an A2-sized poster.

Singles

Storm the Sorrow
On 3 February 2012, the band released on iTunes the single "Storm the Sorrow", characterized by melodic vocal lines and electronic influences. The video, shot in the middle of the same month in Amsterdam, was released on 24 April.

Charts

References

Epica (band) albums
2012 albums
Nuclear Blast albums